The discography of American band DNCE consists of one studio album, two extended plays, eight singles (including three as a featured artist), and other album appearances. The group released their debut single, "Cake by the Ocean", on September 18, 2015. Though starting out slow, the song went on to become a success in numerous territories, peaking at number 9 on the Billboard Hot 100, and at number 7 on the Canadian Hot 100. The group released their debut extended play, Swaay, on October 23, 2015. The four-track album received a generally positive critical reception upon its release, with Entertainment Weekly writing that it "splits the difference between [Joe's] former band’s slick power pop and the electro-kissed pop stylings of his solo album." They have sold over 5 million singles worldwide. After 2018 ended, DNCE went on hiatus as lead singer Joe Jonas and drummer Jack Lawless resumed work with the Jonas Brothers after their reunion in 2019. DNCE returned in February 2022.

Studio albums

Re-issued albums

Extended plays

Singles

As lead artist

As featured artist

Promotional singles

Guest appearances

Music videos
As lead artist

As featured artist

As actor

Notes

References

Discographies of American artists
DNCE
Pop music group discographies